Allan Kilavuka is a Kenyan businessman and corporate executive, who has served as the chief executive officer of Kenya Airways, the national airline of Kenya, since 1 April 2020. He previously served as the CEO of Jambojet, a low-cost carrier wholly owned by Kenya Airways, from January 2019 to 31 March 2020.

Background and education
Kilavuka was born in Kenya and attended local primary and secondary schools. He studied at the University of Nairobi, graduating with a Bachelor of Commerce. He then went on to obtain a Certificate in Psychology from the University of Liverpool in the United Kingdom. He has also attended courses in advanced management, executive leadership and financial management at Crotonville Leadership Institute, in Westchester County, New York, United States, owned by General Electric.

Career
Before he took up his assignment with Jambojet, where his appointment was announced in November 2018, he was the head of General Electric (GE) in sub-Saharan Africa. Prior to that, he served in various capacities at GE and at Deloitte, in their sub-Saharan African businesses.

At Kenya Airways, he replaced Sebastian Mickosz, the Polish former chief executive, who resigned for personal reasons, before the expiry of his three-year contract. Kilavuka will now sit on all the boards of Kenya Airways subsidiary companies. He will remain at the board of Jambojet, initially as the CEO and as a representative of Kenya Airways, starting on 1 April 2020.

One of his first initiatives at KQ was to order a 25 percent executive pay cut for all top managers at the airline, beginning on 1 April 2020. The measure is aimed at conserving cash at the limping airline during the COVID-19 pandemic. As part of the same exercise, the company's board of directors will forego their board allowances during the same period.

See also
 Michael Joseph
 Titus Naikuni
 Emile Nguza Arao
 Liz Aluvanze

References

External links
 Kenya Airways names new acting CEO from 1 January 2020

Living people
Year of birth missing (living people)
Kenyan chief executives
University of Nairobi alumni
Alumni of the University of Liverpool
Kenya Airways people